Artemius served as Greek Orthodox Patriarch of Alexandria between 1845 and 1847.

References
 

19th-century Greek Patriarchs of Alexandria